On the evening of January 18, the Danish Parliament agreed to a financial package worth 100 billion Danish kroner (17.6 billion USD). In response, markets panicked yet again. On January 22, the editorial board of The Christian Science Monitor wrote that the four largest U.S. banks "have lost half of their value since January 2."

The two-month period from January 1-February 27 represented the worst start to a year in the history of the S&P 500 with a drop in value of 18.62%. By March 2, the Dow Jones Industrial Average Index had dropped more than 50% from its October 2007 peak. The decline has been compared to that of the 1929 Great Depression, which was 53% between September 1929 and March 1931.

On March 6, the Bank of England announced up to 150 billion pounds of quantitative easing, increasing the risk of inflation.

In March 2009, Blackstone Group CEO Stephen Schwarzman said that up to 45% of global wealth had been destroyed by the global financial crisis.

By March 9, 2009, the Dow had fallen to 6,500, a percentage decline exceeding the pace of the market's fall during the Great Depression and a level which the index had last seen in 1997. On March 10, 2009, a countertrend bear market rally began, taking the Dow up to 8,500 by May 6, 2009. Financial stocks were up more than 150% during this rally. By May 9, financial stocks had rallied more than 150% in just over two months.

On June 22 the World Bank projected that the global production for 2009 would fall by 2.9%, the first decline since the second world war.

See also 
Global financial crisis in September 2008
Global financial crisis in October 2008
Global financial crisis in November 2008
Global financial crisis in December 2008
Subprime crisis impact timeline
Timeline of the United States housing bubble for the pre-subprime crisis timeline

References 

2000s economic history
Great Recession